Group 7 of the UEFA Euro 1972 qualifying tournament was one of the eight groups to decide which teams would qualify for the UEFA Euro 1972 finals tournament. Group 7 consisted of four teams: Yugoslavia, Netherlands, East Germany, and Luxembourg, where they played against each other home-and-away in a round-robin format. The group winners were Yugoslavia, who finished two points above the Netherlands and East Germany.

Final table

Matches

Goalscorers

References
 
 
 

Group 7
1970–71 in Yugoslav football
1971–72 in Yugoslav football
1970–71 in Dutch football
1971–72 in Dutch football
1970–71 in East German football
1971–72 in East German football
1970–71 in Luxembourgian football
1971–72 in Luxembourgian football